Lejiawan (Mandarin: 乐家湾镇) is a town in Chengdong District, Xining, Qinghai, China. In 2010, Lejiawan had a total population of 35,640: 18,725 males and 16,915 females: 4,919 aged under 14, 28,041 aged between 15 and 65 and 2,680 aged over 65.

References 
 

Township-level divisions of Qinghai
Xining
Towns in China